Bauk is an animal-like mythical creature in Serbian mythology. The bauk is described as hiding in dark places, holes, or abandoned houses, waiting to grab, carry away, and devour its victim; but it can be scared away by light and noise. It has a clumsy gait (bauljanje), and its onomatopea is bau.

Interpretation of the bauk's attributes leads to the conclusion that the bauk is actually a description of real bears, which were already regionally extinct in some parts of Serbia and known only as legend. The word "bauk" was initially used as a hypocorism.

In popular culture
Bauk is used as the translation for goblin in Serbian editions of works of J. R. R. Tolkien, first translated by Mary and Milan Milišić. Bauk is also used as the translation for the Imp in the Serbian edition of A Song of Ice and Fire series, translated by Nikola Pajvančić. It's also used as the Croatian translation for Boggart in the Harry Potter book series.

See also
 Bear in culture

References

Slavic mythology
Serbian folklore
Fictional bears
Legendary mammals
Slavic legendary creatures